Callona tricolor is a species of beetle in the family Cerambycidae. It was described by G. R. Waterhouse in 1840.

References

Callona
Beetles described in 1840